The Senior men's race at the 2001 IAAF World Cross Country Championships was held at the Hippodrome Wellington in Ostend (Oostende), Belgium, on March 25, 2001.  Reports of the event were given in The New York Times, in the Herald, and for the IAAF.

Complete results for individuals, for teams, medallists, and the results of British athletes who took part were published.

Race results

Senior men's race (12.3 km)

Individual

Teams

Note: Athletes in parentheses did not score for the team result

Participation
An unofficial count yields the participation of 169 athletes from 47 countries in the Senior men's race.

 (6)
 (1)
 (6)
 (4)
 (4)
 (6)
 (5)
 (4)
 (6)
 (2)
 (6)
 (5)
 (1)
 (6)
 (2)
 (2)
 (5)
 (6)
 (1)
 (4)
 (6)
 (6)
 (4)
 (6)
 (1)
 (1)
 (3)
 (1)
 (1)
 (1)
 (6)
 (1)
 (1)
 (1)
 (6)
 (4)
 (1)
 (5)
 (5)
 (4)
 (1)
 (6)
 (6)
 (4)
 (1)
 (4)
 (1)

See also
 2001 IAAF World Cross Country Championships – Men's short race
 2001 IAAF World Cross Country Championships – Junior men's race
 2001 IAAF World Cross Country Championships – Senior women's race
 2001 IAAF World Cross Country Championships – Women's short race
 2001 IAAF World Cross Country Championships – Junior women's race

References

Senior men's race at the World Athletics Cross Country Championships
IAAF World Cross Country Championships